What's On may refer to:
What's On (Canadian TV program)
What's On (Australian TV program)